Higi is a consumer health service that creates health stations, offers educational content and health risk tests and offers digital and home health tools. The kiosks appear in supermarkets, pharmacies, and other retail locations. Higi has nearly 10,000 health stations in the United States. It was founded in 2012 by Khan Siddiqui and Michael W. Ferro Jr., the owner of the Chicago Sun-Times.

Company
Higi acquired Merge Health Information Kiosks for $2.75 million in 2012 and kiosk provider Stayhealthy in 2014 for an undisclosed amount. It received investment from BlueCross BlueShield's venture fund in 2017. Another notable investor is Lupe Fiasco, who accepted a role as creative director of the company. As part of the Blue Shield investment, Higi acquired a Seattle company called EveryMove.

In 2017, Sam's Club began offering Higi in its stores Higi also placed kiosks at Vanderbilt University and Wegman's supermarkets The kiosks are also at Kroger, Meijer, Shopko, Rite Aid and other stores.

In 2018, Higi raised a Series C round of $21.3 million from Flare Capital Partners and 7wireVentures.

Higi named a new Chairman Chris Kryder in August 2018.

In January 2022, Higi was acquired by Babylon Health.

References

Companies based in Chicago
Medical technology companies of the United States